Kärkölä is a municipality of Finland. It is located in the province of Southern Finland and is part of the Päijänne Tavastia region. Its seat is in Järvelä, which is located along the Riihimäki–Lahti railway.

Neighbour municipalities: Hausjärvi, Hollola, Hämeenlinna, Mäntsälä and Orimattila.

The municipality is unilingually Finnish.

History
Kärkölä once belonged to the Hollola parish, and in 1711 it became the Hollola chapel parish. The first church was completed in 1754 and the second in 1889. Officially, the municipality of Kärkölä was founded in 1867. In the late 19th century, the eccentric engineer named Carl Constantin Collin, who ruled over large areas of both Hollola and Kärkölä, built large parks and building groups in the Huovila area.

Villages
Hevonoja, Hongisto, Hähkäniemi, Iso-Sattiala, Järvelä, Karvala, Kärkölä (Kirkonkylä), Lappila, Maavehmaa, Marttila, Nummenkulma, Uusikylä, Vähä-Sattiala

Notable people
 Carl Niclas von Hellens (1745–1820), botanist
 Erik Gabriel Melartin (1780–1847), the Archbishop of Turku
 Helvi Sipilä (1915–2009), diplomat, lawyer and politician
 Emil Väre (1885–1974), wrestler and Olympics gold medalist

See also
 Finnish national road 54
 Järvelä railway station

References

External links

Municipality of Kärkölä – Official website 

 
Populated places established in 1865